Perplicaria boucheti is a species of sea snail, a marine gastropod mollusk in the family Cancellariidae, the nutmeg snails.

Description

Distribution
This marine species occurs off the Tanimbar Islands, Indonesia.

References

 Verhecken, A. (1997). Mollusca, Gastropoda: Arafura Sea Cancellariidae collected during the KARUBAR Cruise. in: Crosnier, A. et al. (Ed.) Résultats des Campagnes MUSORSTOM 16. Campagne Franco-Indonésienne KARUBAR. Mémoires du Muséum national d'Histoire naturelle. Série A, Zoologie. 172: 295-324

Cancellariidae
Gastropods described in 1997